Vellan Kumaran (fl. mid-10th century AD), diksa name Chaturanana Pandita, was a Kerala commander in the Chola army and a close confidant of prince Rajaditya. He was probably one of the few Chola commanders to have survived the battle of Takkolam in 948/49 AD. Kumaran is best known for engraving his own tragic autobiography in an inscription at Tiruvotriyur, Madras (around 10 years after he had become an ascetic).  

Kumaran was the son of Rajasekhara, the chieftain of Valluvanatu in Kerala. He is also described as a native of "Nandikkarai Puttur" in Kerala. The inscriptions say that he went to Chola country after completing education in his boyhood and became a commander to prince Rajaditya in the Chola army. After the battle of Takkolam, he became an ascetic and settled at Tiruvotriyur as the disciple of certain Niranjana Guru. Eventually Kumaran, now known as Chaturanana Pandita, became the founder of a matha (the Kalamukha monastery) at Tiruvotriyur.

The true significance of the life of Kumaran was discovered by historian V. Raghavan.

Background

Chola defeat at Takkolam 
The battle of Takkolam (948/49 AD) was a military engagement between a contingent of troops led by Chola prince Rajaditya and another led by the Rashtrakuta king Krishna III (939–967 AD). The battle resulted in the death of Rajaditya on the battlefield and the defeat of the Chola garrison at Takkolam. 

The Rashtrakutas conquered eastern and northern parts of the Chola empire and advanced up to Rameswaram. As per the Karhad copper plates of Krishna III (959 AD) the king "uprooted the Cholas, distributed their territory among his followers, and extracted tribute from the Chera and Pandya kings" during his campaign. The Sravana Belgola record of Ganga king Marasimha (963 - 975 AD) also claims victory of the Chera king for his predecessor Bhutuga II. 

The death of prince Rajaditya is unusually commemorated by the Cholas. The Chola version of the events can be found in Larger Leiden Grant (1006 CE) of Rajaraja I and Tiruvalangadu Plates (1018 CE) of Rajendra I.

Kerala military personnel at Takkolam 
Prince Rajaditya was the son of the Ko Kizhan Atikal, the Chera/Perumal princess, and the Chola king Parantaka I (907–955 AD). It is known that the Ko Kizhan Atikal, mother of prince Rajaditya, was present at Rajadityapura (Tirunavalur/Tirumanallur) (in the 28th year of Parantaka, c. 935 AD) with her entire entourage for some time. 

Prince Rajaditya commanded a whole contingent of Kerala military personnel in Tirumunaippati Natu as early as the 930s.

According to historians, the mid-10th century witnessed a large migration of Kerala people into the Chola country in search of "commercial profit and military adventure". A warrior known as Malaiyana Otrai Chevakan shows up in the army of prince Arikulaseri from a record from Kizhur, South Arcot. Several merchants from Kodungallur in Malai Natu are present in inscriptions from Kudumiya Malai (Pudukkottah), Tirucchanur (South Arcot), Udaiyargudi (South Arcot), Tirumalpurarm (North Arcot) and Tiruvenkatu.

Inscriptions of Vellan Kumaran or Chaturanana Pandita

As Vellan Kumaran

As Chaturanana Pandita (Valabha Guha)

References 

10th-century Indian people
History of Kerala
People of the Kodungallur Chera kingdom
Malayali people
History of Tamil Nadu